Rayna Ivanova Grigorova (born 25 July 1931) is a Bulgarian former artistic gymnast. She competed at the 1952, 1960, and 1964 Summer Olympics.

References

External links
 

1931 births
Possibly living people
Bulgarian female artistic gymnasts
Gymnasts at the 1952 Summer Olympics
Gymnasts at the 1960 Summer Olympics
Gymnasts at the 1964 Summer Olympics
Olympic gymnasts of Bulgaria